Anurag Singh Thakur (born 24 October 1974) is an Indian politician from the Bharatiya Janata Party and a Member of Parliament in the Lok Sabha from Hamirpur, Himachal Pradesh. He is the current Minister of Sports, Youth Affairs and Minister of Information and Broadcasting in the Second Modi ministry. His father, Prem Kumar Dhumal was a former Chief Minister of Himachal Pradesh. 

Previously, Thakur served as a Minister of State for Finance and Corporate Affairs. He was first elected to the Lok Sabha in May 2008 in a by poll as a candidate of the Bharatiya Janata Party. Coming from a political family of Himachal Pradesh, he is a long serving, four time Member of Parliament, being a member of 14th, 15th, 16th, and 17th Lok Sabha. 

Previously, he was the president of the Board of Control for Cricket in India (BCCI) from May 2015 to February 2017, and had to leave that position after the Supreme Court order on BCCI governance. On July 29, 2016, he became the first serving Member of Parliament from the BJP to become a regular commissioned officer in the Territorial Army.  
He was involved in a legal struggle between the Himachal Pradesh State Government and the Himachal Pradesh Cricket Association over the rights to the International Cricket Stadium at Dharamshala. There was also controversy over his appointment as the president of the Board of Control for Cricket in India (BCCI) and he had to leave that position following a Supreme Court order.

Early life and education
Thakur was born on 24 October 1974 in Hamirpur, Himachal Pradesh and his family belongs to the Hindu Rajput community. He is the younger son of Prem Kumar Dhumal and Sheela Devi. His father, Prem Kumar Dhumal was a former Chief Minister of Himachal Pradesh. He has done his bachelors B.A. degree from Doaba College, Jalandhar, Punjab.

Political career

In May 2008, Thakur succeeded his father when he was elected as Member of Parliament of India's 14th Lok Sabha from Hamirpur constituency. He was re-elected to the 15th Lok Sabha in 2009, 16th Loksabha in 2014, and 17th Loksabha in 2019. Later, in 2010 Thakur was appointed the national president of Bharatiya Janata Yuva Morcha. 

January 19, 2019 he became the first Bharatiya Janata Party MP to be awarded the Sansad Ratna Award, an award established in 2010 for recognizing contributions by parliamentarians.

Minister
In May 2019, Thakur became Minister of State for Finance and Corporate Affairs.

On 7 July 2021, Thakur was appointed as the Minister of Youth Affairs and Sports and Minister of Information & Broadcasting. in the Second Modi ministry as part of changes in the Union Council of Ministers.

Goli Maro chants
In the 2020 Delhi elections, he was accused of being one of the leaders who incited communal tension in Delhi using the inflammatory slogan "traitors of the country", to which his audience replied "shoot the bastards", which were repeated by him in January 2020 at a BJP rally. On being questioned about the statements by the media on March 1, 2020, he responded by saying, "You are lying, ... the matter is sub-judice." and  “I think sometimes there is lack of information in the media too regarding the way some things are projected.”.
 The Election Commission of India ordered that Thakur be removed from the BJP's list of star campaigners and then imposed a 72 hour campaigning ban on him. Following Thakur's speech, at least three incidents were reported in which Anti-CAA protestors were fired upon.

Cricket career

Professional player
Anurag Thakur played a Ranji Trophy match against Jammu & Kashmir in November 2000 when he was the president of HPCA. He has played one match in first-class cricket representing Himachal Pradesh and leading the team as captain in a match against Jammu and Kashmir in the 2000/2001 season. Jammu and Kashmir won by 4 wickets. He "picked himself" for the match so as to fulfill the BCCI criterion (which requires state administrators to have at least one first-class match experience) for becoming a selector at the state level. After the match, he appointed himself as the chairman of selectors of HPCA Ranji trophy cricket team.

This debut was his one and only first-class cricket match. This experience in first-class cricket enabled his induction into the BCCI national junior selection committee, satisfying the condition that only first-class players could be national selectors.

Administrative head 
Thakur served as the president of the Himachal Pradesh Cricket Association for four straight terms since 2000. His tenure saw development of five stadium in Himachal Pradesh including the stadium in Dharamsala.

He was the president of the [[Board of Control for Cricket  of India order on 02/01/2017. Early on in his administrative tenure, he gained fame for possibly being the first cricketer to have made his first-class debut after taking over as the president of the Himachal Pradesh Cricket Association (HPCA) in July 2000.

Appointment as BCCI president 
Thakur rose through the ranks in cricketing administration bodies to the position of secretary for BCCI. On 22 May 2016, Thakur became the president of BCCI, but his tenure was cut short when the Supreme Court of India ruled on the Lodha Committee's third status report, submitted on 14 November 2016, asking for the disqualification of office-bearers of the BCCI and all state associations, who became ineligible as per the Apex Court's 18 July 2016 order.

The court dismissed Thakur on 2 January 2017 for defying its 2016 order to implement the Lodha Committee reforms. It also initiated contempt proceedings against Thakur for what it prima facie deemed as perjury about his correspondence with the International Cricket Council. He submitted an affidavit of apology to the court which was rejected, following which he filed an unconditional and unequivocal apology. The court finally relented and dropped its contempt and perjury proceedings against him.

Personal life
Thakur married Shefali Thakur, daughter of Gulab Singh Thakur, former Minister in the Government of Himachal Pradesh, on 27 November 2002.

Territorial Army 
 
In July 2016, Anurag Thakur became a part of the territorial army, becoming the first serving BJP Member of Parliament to become a TA Officer. He has been promoted to the rank of captain.

References

External links

 
 
 

1974 births
Living people
Bharatiya Janata Party politicians from Himachal Pradesh
India MPs 2004–2009
India MPs 2009–2014
Lok Sabha members from Himachal Pradesh
India MPs 2014–2019
Indian cricket administrators
Himachal Pradesh cricketers
Presidents of the Board of Control for Cricket in India
People from Hamirpur, Himachal Pradesh
Members of the Board of Control for Cricket in India
India MPs 2019–present
National Democratic Alliance candidates in the 2019 Indian general election
Narendra Modi ministry